Gerrit de Vries (born 13 May 1967) is a retired road racing cyclist from the Netherlands, who was a professional from 1989 to 1997. As an amateur he won the world title in the 100 km team time trial, alongside Rob Harmeling, Tom Cordes and John Talen in 1986. His team finished in 11th place in this event at the 1988 Summer Olympics. De Vries rode in six editions of the Tour de France.

Tour de France results
1990 – 67th
1991 – 34th
1993 – 55th
1994 – 77th
1996 – 119th
1997 – 125th

See also
 List of Dutch Olympic cyclists

References

1967 births
Living people
Dutch male cyclists
Olympic cyclists of the Netherlands
Cyclists at the 1988 Summer Olympics
People from Ooststellingwerf
UCI Road World Champions (elite men)
UCI Road World Championships cyclists for the Netherlands
Cyclists from Friesland
21st-century Dutch people
20th-century Dutch people